Badger's Green is a 1930 British comedy play written by R.C. Sheriff. A company has ambitious plans to redevelop the quiet, picturesque village of Badger's Green. The inhabitants mount a resistance campaign and it is eventually decided to settle the future of the village by playing a cricket match.

The play originally opened in June 1930 at London's Prince of Wales Theatre, where it ran for only 35 performances. It has however, been adapted for the screen three times: a 1934 version starring Valerie Hobson, a 1938 version starring Maurice Denham and a 1949 version starring Garry Marsh.
It was also adapted for television twice: a now-lost 1938 version on BBC television and a 1958 version as part of ITV Television Playhouse, also lost.

Original West End cast
Mr. Butler - Felix Aylmer
Mr. Rogers - Frederick Burtwell
Mr. Butler's secretary - Maisie Darrell
Dickie Wetherby - Robert Douglas
Ginger - George Elliston
Major Forrester - Louis Goodrich
Mary - Kathleen Harrison
Dr. Wetherby - Horace Hodges
Mrs Wetherby - Margaret Scudamore
Woman - Peggy Seton
Mrs. Forrester - Hilda Sims
Mr. Twigg - Sebastian Smith

References

1930 plays
Comedy plays
Plays by R. C. Sherriff
West End plays